"Take Us Back" is the 2014 single by the New Zealand boy band Titanium. It was released on Titanium Music own label under exclusive license to LTPS Music Limited (Warner).

Charts and certifications

Release history

External links 
https://web.archive.org/web/20141127144832/https://itunes.apple.com/nz/album/take-us-back-single/id911719209

2014 singles
Titanium (band) songs
2014 songs
Songs written by Vince Harder